Nuno Alexandre Nogueira Marques (born 17 March 1981) is a Portuguese football coach and former goalkeeper who serves as goalkeeping coach for Notodden FK in Norway.

Norway

Arranging to a two-year agreement with Lyn of the Norwegian Premier League in February 2004, Marques was second-string goalkeeper behind Ali Al-Habsi and was sent to FK Tønsberg for the rest of the 2005 season. Next, he trialed with Bryne, who were in the Norwegian 1. divisjon, earning a contract lasting until 2008. Despite being the second-choice goalkeeper at Bryne, the Benfica youth graduate started the first round of the 2007 Norwegian First Division away to Løv-Ham, earning praise from his coach despite losing the game. However, the Portuguese goalkeeper picked up a knee injury in May that year, leaving him out for the rest of the season. By 2008, Marques was at Notodden FK, then of the Norwegian First Division, repudiating rumors of Greek clubs signing him.

References

External links 
 
 Lyn statistics
 Notodden-keeper blir nedringt av portugisisk presse Dagbladet.no
 Da baliza do Benfica a um instituto superior da Noruega
 Nuno Marques: «Benfica está bem servido de guarda-redes»

Portuguese footballers
Association football goalkeepers
Living people
1981 births
People from Tomar
Portuguese expatriate footballers
Expatriate footballers in Norway
Portuguese expatriate sportspeople in Norway
U.F.C.I. Tomar players
S.L. Benfica B players
C.F. Estrela da Amadora players
Lyn Fotball players
FK Tønsberg players
Bryne FK players
Notodden FK players
Segunda Divisão players
Eliteserien players
Norwegian First Division players
Sportspeople from Santarém District